Jam City may refer to:

Jam City,  The alias of UK Music Producer / DJ Jack Latham

 Jam City,  Los Angeles-based Mobile Game Producer